Sihanoukville may refer to:
Sihanoukville Province, Cambodia
Sihanoukville (city)
Sihanoukville Autonomous Port
Sihanoukville Municipality
Sihanoukville International Airport

See also

Sihanouk